Bheemgal is a town in the Nizamabad district,  in the state of Telangana in India,  52.2  km from the main city of the District, Nizamabad and 172  km from the State Capital Hyderabad.

Demographics
Total population of Bheemgal Mandal is 57,262 living in 12,239 Houses, Spread across total 24 villages and 18 panchayats.  Males are 27,924 and Females are 29,338.

References

Villages in Nizamabad district